In 2009, the Campeonato Brasileiro Série D, the fourth division of the Brazilian Football, is currently being contested for first time in history. The competition has 40 clubs, four of which will eventually qualify to the Campeonato Brasileiro Série C to be contested in 2010.

Competition format
The 40 teams are divided in ten groups of 4, playing within them in a double round-robin format. The two best ranked in each group at the end of 6 rounds will qualify to the Second Stage, which will be played in home-and-away system. Winners advance to Third Stage along with the three losers with best record in previous stages. The quarterfinal winners will be promoted to the Série C 2010. As there is no Série E, technically there will be no relegation. However, teams who were not promoted will have to re-qualify for Série D 2010 through their respective state leagues.

Participating teams
Sorted by state, ordered by CBF State Ranking as of December 2007 . Each state federation has its own criteria to indicate a club to this tournament.

1 The second best team Bangu withdrew.
2 The 2008 Copa Rio would go to Copa do Brasil 2009 and the 2nd placed to Campeonato Brasileiro Série D 2009. The champion Nova Iguaçu withdrew. The 2nd placed Americano went to Copa do Brasil 2009 and the 3rd Madureira was able to Campeonato Brasileiro Série D 2009.
3 The second best team Veranópolis, 3rd Santa Cruz, and 4th Ulbra all withdrew.
4 The first best team Rio Branco de Andradas and 2nd EC Democrata both withdrew.
5 The second best team Porto withdrew.
6 The first best team Itumbiara, 3rd Santa Helena and 4th Trindade all withdrew.
7 The first best team ASSU, 2nd Potyguar Seridoense, 3rd Santa Cruz, 4th Baraúnas and 5th Potiguar all withdrew.
8 The first best team Corinthians Alagoano, 2nd Coruripe, 3rd Murici, 4th Igaci, 5th Ipanema and 6th CSE all withdrew.
9 The first best team Sousa withdrew.
10 The first best team Juventus, 2nd Atlético Acreano, 3rd Vasco da Gama and 4th Náuas all withdrew and no other team was able to represent Acre state.
11 The first best team Vilhena withdrew.

Results

First stage

Group 1

1 Match won by WO.

Group 2

Group 3

Group 4

Group 5

Group 6

Group 7

Group 8

Group 9

Group 10

Second stage

|}

Teams in the left column played second match at home.

Third stage

|}

Teams in the left column play second match at home.

Three of the five 3rd stage losers qualify due to their overall record:

Bracket

* plays second leg at home.
(p) won on penalty shootout.
(a) won by away goals rule.

Quarterfinals

|}

Teams in the left column play second match at home.

Semifinals

|}

Teams in the left column play second match at home.

Finals

|}

Teams in the left column play second match at home.

Campeonato Brasileiro Série D seasons
4